This is a list of mayors of Regina, the capital city of the Canadian province of Saskatchewan. The mayor leads Regina City Council, the city's governing body. The 42nd and current mayor is Sandra Masters, who was first elected in 2020.

From 1920 to 1926, Regina mayors were elected using Instant-runoff voting. All other times First past the post was used.

List of Mayors

See also 

 Regina City Council

References

External links 

 Office of the Mayor

Regina